Starting on September 2, 2003, 4Kids Entertainment and Funimation Entertainment began distributing 2003 Teenage Mutant Ninja Turtles animated TV series to DVD, and originally also to VHS. The latest VHS release occurred on June 7, 2005, while the original run of DVD releases continued until October 21, 2008.

Release pattern
Many fans heavily criticized Funimation's erratic release patterns, and while a more traditional seasonal release pattern began in 2007, production ceased following Nickelodeon purchasing the entire TMNT franchise in October 2009. In June 2015, Nickelodeon began once again releasing DVDs of the series. However, they too began an erratic release pattern, with several months between volumes and each volume containing only three non-sequential episodes.

List

See also
 List of Teenage Mutant Ninja Turtles (2003 TV series) episodes
 List of Teenage Mutant Ninja Turtles (2003 TV series) characters
 List of Teenage Mutant Ninja Turtles (1987 TV series) home video releases
 List of Teenage Mutant Ninja Turtles (2012 TV series) home video releases

References

External links
 First trailer

Home video
Home video, 2003
Teenage Mutant Ninja Turtles (2003 TV series)